Jamie Harris (born 15 May 1963) is a British actor. He is best known for his role as The Hook-Handed Man in Lemony Snicket's A Series of Unfortunate Events, Rodney in Rise of the Planet of the Apes and Gordon in Marvel's Agents of S.H.I.E.L.D..

Early life
Harris was born on 15 May 1963 in Whitechapel, London as Tudor St. John Harris and is the third and youngest of three boys to Irish actor Richard Harris and Welsh socialite Elizabeth Rees-Williams. His older brothers are director Damian Harris and actor Jared Harris.

Education
Harris was educated at Ladycross, a former preparatory boarding independent school in the coastal town of Seaford in East Sussex, as were his brothers Jared and Damian, followed by Downside School, a Catholic boarding independent school in the village of Stratton-on-the-Fosse (near the market town of Shepton Mallet) in Somerset, in South West England.

Filmography

References

External links
 

1963 births
Living people
20th-century British male actors
21st-century British male actors
British male film actors
British male television actors
British people of Irish descent
British people of Welsh descent
Male actors from London
People educated at Downside School
People from Whitechapel